Major-General Sir William Henry Birkbeck,   (8 April 1863 – 16 April 1929) was a British Army officer and administrator. He served in the Second Boer War and First World War, and was the director of remounts at British Army Headquarters from 1912 to 1920.

Early life and education
Birkbeek was born on 8 April 1863 in Settle, West Riding of Yorkshire, England to banker Joseph Birkbeck and Mary Elizabeth (née Mackesy). He was educated at Summer Fields School and Wellington College, where he was on the cricket team. He then entered the Royal Military College, Sandhurst.

Career

In 1883, Birkbeek was commissioned as a lieutenant in the 1st King's Dragoon Guards, then sent to India. He served in the Hazara Expedition of 1888 and Chin Lushai Expedition of 1889-90 as a signalling officer. He was mentioned in despatches and received the campaign medal and two clasps, and was promoted to captain on 31 January 1890.

He became aide-de-camp to Major-General Henry Clement Wilkinson, commanding the North-Eastern District at York, while he prepared for entrance to Staff College, Camberley. He was in the famous 1896-97 class at Staff College that included Douglas Haig, 1st Earl Haig and Edmund Allenby, 1st Viscount Allenby, and many other officers who distinguished themselves in the Second Boer War and First World War, and was promoted to major on 3 April 1897.

Birkbeck served throughout the Second Boer War in South Africa as assistant Inspector of Remounts and received the brevet promotion to lieutenant-colonel on 29 November 1900. He impressed his superiors, the Commander-in-Chief in South Africa, Lord Kitchener, referred to him in a despatch as "perturbed by nothing" and with "considerable ability". For his service in the war he was created a Companion of the Order of the Bath (CB) in the October 1902 South Africa Honours list.

Following the war, he served with the War Office for two year as a Staff officer with military education and training under Field-Marshal Sir Henry Wilson, who became one of his closest friends. In 1905, he was posted for a year with the Japanese Army in Manchuria, "where his immense size and genial nature made an excellent impression on our Allies, and led them to help him with much valuable information for his reports."

After returning home, he spent several years as commander of the Cavalry School, on Netheravon. In 1912, he returned to the remount service, and served as its director with the War Office from 1912 to 1920.

Personal life

In 1905, he married American Mabel (née Shaw), of New Brighton, Staten Island. They had three sons (including Major-General Theodore Birkbeck).

In 1915, he suffered a fall from his horse and was injured, and never fully recovered. He died after a fall while hiking at St. Briac, near Dinard in France in 1929.

Honours

1902 – Companion of the Order of the Bath
1906 – Companion of the Order of St Michael and St George 
1915 – Knight Commander of the Order of the Bath
1917 – Commander of the Order of the Crown
1917 – Commander of the Legion of Honour

References

Deaths from falls
1863 births
1929 deaths
People from Settle, North Yorkshire
Knights Commander of the Order of the Bath
Companions of the Order of St Michael and St George
People educated at Summer Fields School
People educated at Wellington College, Berkshire
Graduates of the Royal Military College, Sandhurst
British Army personnel of the Second Boer War
Graduates of the Staff College, Camberley
Commanders of the Order of the Crown (Belgium)
Commandeurs of the Légion d'honneur
English cricketers
Norfolk cricketers
Sport deaths in France
British Army major generals
1st King's Dragoon Guards officers
British Army cavalry generals of World War I